Sagiolechia bairdensis is a species of lichenized fungus found in southeastern Alaska. It grows on small rocks or pebbles. The lichen has a smooth grey thallus and appears in patches along the grains of the rocks.  These patches are small, covering 2 mm X 1 mm spherical areas. Sagiolechia bairdensis differs from others in its genus with its small apothecia, non-trentepohliod photobiont, hyaline 3-septate ascospores and by occurring on siliceous rock.

References 

Ostropales
Lichens described in 2021
Lichen species